Peter McNeeley (born October 6, 1968) is an American former heavyweight boxer, best known for his 1995 fight with Mike Tyson, before which McNeeley had said he would wrap Tyson in a "cocoon of horror." McNeeley fought aggressively but was knocked down twice within the first two minutes. McNeeley was disqualified after his manager Vinnie Vecchione stepped into the ring to stop his fighter from taking any more punishment after the second knockdown. TV Guide included the fight in their list of the 50 Great TV Sports Moments of All Time in 1998.

Early life
Peter Smith McNeeley was born on 6 October 1968 in Medfield, Massachusetts, U.S.; the child of Nancy McNeeley, (née Gray) (1944–2018) and Tom McNeeley (1937–2011). His father was a former heavyweight contender who challenged Floyd Patterson for the world heavyweight championship, and later served eight years as the boxing commissioner of the Massachusetts State Boxing Commission. His mother, Nancy, was a former Miss America contestant from New Hampshire. His youngest brother was referred to as “Snubby.” McNeeley's grandfather, Thomas McNeeley Sr. was a New England boxing champion and fought on the 1928 Olympic boxing team.

Amateur boxing career
McNeeley had 21 amateur fights, finishing his amateur career with the record 15–6. Albeit a brief amateur career, he successfully represented the United States, wherein he defeated Wayne Bernard, the world Maritime heavyweight champion; and the first round knockout of No. 1 ranked US amateur James Johnson. He won the New England Golden Gloves in Lowell, Massachusetts in 1989 and the New England Diamond Belt Tournament later that year.

Personal life
In 1995, McNeeley was arrested and charged with assault and using batteries as a dangerous weapon. In March 2006, McNeeley was arrested in Norwood, Massachusetts, after he punched a man and stole his wallet containing $200. In June 2006, McNeeley was arrested for driving the getaway car used in a robbery of a Walgreens in Stoughton, Massachusetts.  After searching the car, police recovered $180 in cash and a black fanny pack which had also been stolen from the store. The charges were later reduced to larceny.

Professional boxing record

References

External links
 
Official Website

Heavyweight boxers
Boxers from Boston
1968 births
Living people
American male boxers
American people of Irish descent
Bridgewater State University alumni
People from Norwood, Massachusetts
American sportspeople convicted of crimes
American people convicted of assault
American people convicted of robbery